The Crazy Family may refer to:
 The Crazy Family (1940 film), a Swedish comedy film directed by Ivar Johansson
 The Crazy Family (1984 film), a Japanese film directed by Sogo Ishii